Douglas Bennett (28 February 1912 – 23 October 1984) was a South African cricketer. He played in ten first-class matches for Eastern Province from 1934/35 to 1936/37.

See also
 List of Eastern Province representative cricketers

References

External links
 

1912 births
1984 deaths
South African cricketers
Eastern Province cricketers
Cricketers from Port Elizabeth